Félix-Hyacinthe Lemaire (March 16, 1808December 17, 1879), was a political figure in Quebec.

He was born in Lac des Deux-Montagnes near Oka, the son of a carpenter and his wife. Lamaire became a notary in 1836 and was appointed agent of the Seminary of St. Sulpice. He served as a Major in the local militia and was a clerk to the circuit court. He served as mayor of Deux-Montagne before being named to the Legislative Council of Quebec as a Conservative representing the district of Mille-Isles on November 2, 1867. He served as Speaker of the Legislative Council from 1874 to 1876. He continued as a Legislative Councillor until he died in office in 1879.

Personal life
In January 1837, Lemaire married Luce Barcelo, who survived him. They had one son and one daughter.

References
 

1808 births
1879 deaths
Presidents of the Legislative Council of Quebec
Conservative Party of Quebec MLCs
Mayors of places in Quebec